Chilieni may refer to several villages in Romania:

 , a village in the city of Sfântu Gheorghe, Covasna County
 , a village in Coroiești Commune, Vaslui County